Dorothy Gould (January 15, 1910 – July 26, 2000) was a vaudeville and motion picture actress from New York City.

Stage actress

Gould participated in a production financed by Alice Pike Barney at the Theater Mart in Hollywood, California, in May 1926. The play, Transgressor, was written by Barney. Gould played the role of Vergie, the American girl. Others in the cast were Ruth Stonehouse
and Ben Alexander. The comedy dealt with life in Paris, France,
particularly the events in the life of an American girl who was there.

In April 1929 Gould appeared in Legitimate Lovers, a play written by Alice and Natalie Barney. A comedy, the theme deals with Mrs. Mucks of Chicago, Illinois. Performed by Gould, Mucks divorces her husband so that she is free to marry an already married author, Horace Littlefield.
A reviewer complimented Goulds acting skills, saying she almost walks away with the show.

Screen player

Gould appeared in two motion pictures. She played Ann Talbot in a
Universal Pictures release entitled The Charlatan (1929). The film featured Holmes Herbert and Margaret Livingston. Her last film credit is for Ladies In Love. From 1930, it is a production of the Chesterfield Motion Pictures Corporation starring Alice Day.

References

Los Angeles Times, New Play Released For Mart, May 19, 1929, Page B3.
Los Angeles Times, Mart Comedy Wins Plaudits of Spectators, April 11, 1929, Page A11.

American film actresses
Vaudeville performers
Actresses from New York City
1910 births
2000 deaths
20th-century American actresses